The Rolling Stones' 1966 American Tour was a concert tour by the band. The tour commenced on June 24 and concluded on July 28, 1966. Two weeks prior to the start of the tour, Mick Jagger collapsed from "nervous exhaustion" and was hospitalized. On this tour, the band supported their album Aftermath. The last gig of the tour in Honolulu, Hawaii was broadcast on Hawaiian radio station KPOI.

The Rolling Stones
Mick Jagger – lead vocals, harmonica, percussion
Keith Richards – guitar, backing vocals
Brian Jones – guitar, harmonica, electric dulcimer, organ, backing vocals
Bill Wyman – bass guitar, backing vocals
Charlie Watts – drums

Tour set list
Songs performed include:
Not Fade Away
The Last Time
Paint It Black
Under My Thumb
Stupid Girl
Time Is On My Side
Lady Jane
Play With Fire
Doncha Bother Me
The Spider And The Fly
Mothers Little Helper
Get Off Of My Cloud
19th Nervous Breakdown
(I Can't Get No) Satisfaction

Tour dates

It has been mistakenly believed the group played two shows in Bakersfield, CA on July 24 but in fact, they had an afternoon show in San Bernardino followed by an evening show in Bakersfield.

Hartford set list:
Intro / "Not Fade Away"
"The Last Time"
"Paint It, Black"
"Lady Jane"
"Mother's Little Helper"
"Get Off Of My Cloud"
"19th Nervous Breakdown"
"(I Can't Get No) Satisfaction"

References in popular culture
 The show at Forest Hills Tennis Stadium in New York provided the setting for a number of scenes in an episode of US TV drama Mad Men, entitled Tea Leaves.

References

 Carr, Roy.  The Rolling Stones: An Illustrated Record.  Harmony Books, 1976.  

The Rolling Stones concert tours
1966 concert tours
Concert tours of Canada
Concert tours of the United States